Bathysciadium costulatum is a species of sea snail, deep-sea limpet, a marine gastropod mollusk in the family Bathysciadiidae.

Distribution
 European waters

Description 
The maximum recorded shell length is 1.5 mm.

Habitat 
Minimum recorded depth is 808 m. Maximum recorded depth is 1400 m.

References

External links

Bathysciadiidae